is a Japanese film director, film critic, and sometimes an actor; he is best known to foreign audiences as Omura in The Last Samurai and as Mr Mita in Fearless. In both his acting roles he portrayed the villain who wants Japan to westernize under the Meiji Restoration in the meantime trying to remove the old ways.

Early life
Harada was born in Numazu, Shizuoka and graduated from Higashi High School. In 1972 he went to London to learn English. He then attended Tokyo College of Photography and Pepperdine University, where he spent number of years training as a filmmaker. He married journalist Mizuho Fukuda in 1976.

Career
Harada made his directorial debut in 1979. He collaborated and showcased his works in Europe and US and worked as an English to Japanese subtitle translator for number of American films showing in Japan.

As an actor, he appeared in Edward Zwick's The Last Samurai in 2003. and Ronny Yu's Fearless in 2006.

Style and influences
In a 2001 interview, Harada stated that Howard Hawks was his mentor.

Filmography

Director
 Farewell, Movie Friend: Indian Summer (1979)
 Uindii (1984)
 Paris/Dakar 1500 (1986)
 The Heartbreak Yakuza (1987)
 Gunhed (1989)
 Tuff 5 (1992)
 Painted Desert (1993)
 Kamikaze Taxi (1995)
 Rowing Through (1996)
 Bounce Ko Gals (1997)
 Spellbound (1999)
 Inugami (2001)
 The Choice of Hercules (2002)
 Bluestockings (2005)
 Densen Uta (2007)
 The Shadow Spirit (2008)
 Climber's High (2008)
 Chronicle of My Mother (2011)
 Return (2013)
 Kakekomi (2015)
 The Emperor in August (2015)
 Sekigahara (2017)
 Killing for the Prosecution (2018)
 Baragaki: Unbroken Samurai (2021)
 Hell Dogs (2022)

Actor
 The Last Samurai (2003) - Mr. Omura
 Fearless (2006) - Mr. Mita

References

External links
 
 

1949 births
Living people
Japanese film directors
People from Numazu, Shizuoka
Japanese subtitlers